Rumbling Bridge is a small village built on both side of a gorge of the River Devon, which formed the boundary between the historic counties of Perthshire and Kinross-shire and is now within the combined Perth and Kinross council area, Scotland, where the A823 leaves the A977. It lies roughly 1 mile equidistant from Muckhart to its north, Crook of Devon to its east and Powmill to its south. It is named after an unusual double bridge, which gives off a distinctive rumbling reverberation at lower levels. Comprising only a few scattered houses until the mid-20th century, most property in the village dates from the 1970s onwards.

The bridge

The "lower" bridge, without parapets, was built in 1713 by William Gray, a mason from Saline.

On 18 March that year there was "the greatest flood ever heard of or seen in Kinross; all the burns were brimfull". On 13 August, "a smart shock of earthquake was felt throughout Kinross at 11 o'clock at night. Plates rattled on shelves; chairs moved about and were thrown over; beds shook, &c."

The river
Unlike the Rumbling Bridge over the River Braan near Dunkeld, the River Devon cannot be canoed. There is a good, well maintained path round the upper gorge built by the armed forces. At the Devil's Mill, the river runs through a rocky channel into a deep basin, descending into a cavity beneath where the rushing of water produces a sound which the 1838 guidebook The Scottish Tourist compares to "that made by the machinery of a mill in motion". The best view of it is from the south bank.

Scenery
Taking the footpath east from here will take you right through to the Crook of Devon. From west of the Rumbling Bridge there is no safe path although an 1838 guidebook The Scottish Tourist says that "the best view of the finely wooded cliffs connected by the Rumbling Bridge, is from a gentle eminence immediately below and opposite to it, upon the north bank. The river, both above and below, bounding from rock to rock, each forming a little cataract, creates a constant tumbling noise; hence the name of the Rumbling Bridge. From the clefts in the face of the rock grow bushes and trees, among which daws and hawks nestle, and from these they are incessantly sporting, thereby giving a pleasing animation to the scene."

The lower gorge is not easily accessible although Caldron Linn ( below Rumbling Bridge), accessed through fields by Powmill, is worth the effort and the  slippery descent to reach it.

The gorge is fairly dangerous. In May 1849, a young boy James Anderson was killed after falling  from the high rocks to the west of the Rumbling Bridge while birdnesting.  And on 6 August 2002, after heavy rains and flash flooding, 16-year Alix-Ann Aisin MacKay fell into the gorge and died whilst trying to cross it with friends.

Environs
The Scripture Union runs an activity centre in the nearby Naemoor House (formerly Lendrick Muir School). Lendrick Muir School was funded by the Colin Nikolic Foundation, run by the former pupil and Head Boy of Lendrick Muir School.

Tourism
On 1 May 1863 Kinross railway line was extended to Rumbling Bridge and Rumbling Bridge railway station was built. The line was extended to Dollar on 15 April 1871. It had taken two years to complete this short, but difficult route. This opened the gorge up to curious Victorians travelling out from Edinburgh and the Rumbling Bridge Hotel was built.

It was a very popular tourist destination even before the railway was built. The clear winding Devon," was celebrated by Robert Burns in his beautiful lyric, "The Banks of the Devon." Miss Charlotte Hamilton (afterwards Mrs. Adair), was the "Loveliest flower on the banks of the Devon" whom Burns met during a visit to the Cauldron Linn on Thursday 30 August 1787. She was at that time residing at Harvieston, near Dollar.

Famous Residents

Dr Grace Cadell (1855–1918), Scotland's first female surgeon and an active leader of the suffragettes lived her final years at Mosspark, Rumbling Bridge, and died there in 1918.

References

 Clackmannan and Kinross: by J.P.Day B.A. B Sc., 1915
 Ordnance Survey Grid Reference: NT 01655 99486
 The Annals of Kinross-shire: Part I: 490AD–1861AD by Dr Ebenezer Henderson, F.R.A.S., LL.D
 The Annals of Kinross-shire: Part II: 1862–1870 by Mr R. L. Wright
 Black's Picturesque Tourist Of Scotland: Published 1861 By Adam and Charles Black
 The Scottish Tourist And Itinerary: Published 1838 by Stirling and Kenney

Villages in Perth and Kinross